Robertson Barracks is a military installation near Swanton Morley in Norfolk. It is home to 1st The Queen's Dragoon Guards.

History

The barracks, named after Field Marshal Sir William Robertson, were established when RAF Swanton Morley were handed over to the British Army in 1995. In April 1998, they became the base of the 9th/12th Royal Lancers, who were replaced by the Light Dragoons in August 2000. The Army sometimes uses the Mid-Norfolk Railway to carry equipment such as Scimitar reconnaissance vehicles belonging to army units based at the barracks to their training facilities in other parts of the United Kingdom.

In 2013, the British Government identified Robertson Barracks as one of seven "core bases" in which it would invest. The Light Dragoons left the barracks on 6 June 2015 and were replaced by the 1st The Queen's Dragoon Guards who were returning from Germany.

Resident unit 
The 1st The Queen's Dragoon Guards are currently based at Robertson Barracks and are scheduled to be repatriated to Chepstow on the base's closure.

Future
In November 2016, the Ministry of Defence announced that the site would close in 2031, this was later brought forward to 2029.

References

Barracks in England
Installations of the British Army
Swanton Morley